The 1997 WNBA season was the inaugural season for the Cleveland Rockers.

Offseason

Initial Player Allocation

WNBA Draft

Regular season

Season standings

Season schedule

Player stats
Janice Braxton ranked sixth in the WNBA in total rebounds with 189
Janice Braxton tied for fifth in the WNBA in blocks with 28. 
Michelle Edwards ranked eighth in the WNBA in assists with 89. 
Isabelle Fijalkowski ranked second in the WNBA in Field Goal Percentage (.508)
Isabelle Fijalkowski ranked eighth in the WNBA in Free Throw Pct with .786 
Eva Nemcova ranked fourth in the WNBA in Field Goal Percentage (.473)
Eva Nemcova ranked fourth in the WNBA in Free Throw Pct with .855 
Eva Nemcova ranked tenth in the WNBA in field goals with 138.
Eva Nemcova ranked eighth in the WNBA in points with 384 points.
Eva Nemcova ranked seventh in the WNBA in minutes per game with 33.7
Eva Nemcova ranked eighth in the WNBA in points per game with 13.7

Awards and honors
Janice Braxton, Ranked second in the WNBA (tied), Defensive Rebounds, 151
Isabelle Fijalkowski: Led WNBA, Personal Fouls, 129
Eva Nemcova: Led WNBA, 3-Pt Field Goal Percentage, .435

References

External links
Rockers on Basketball Reference

Cleveland Rockers seasons
Cleveland
Cleveland Rockers